The Great Brink's Robbery was an armed robbery of the Brink's building in the North End of Boston, Massachusetts, on January 17, 1950. The $2.775 million ($ million today) theft consisted of $1,218,211.29 in cash and $1,557,183.83 in checks, money orders, and other securities. It was at the time the largest robbery in the history of the United States, and has been called "the crime of the century". The robbery remained unsolved for nearly six years, until estranged group member Joseph O'Keefe testified only days before the statute of limitations would have expired. 

Of the eleven people involved in the robbery, eight would receive life sentences after a trial, with two others dying before they could be convicted. Less than $60,000 of the more than $2.7 million stolen would ever be recovered. The robbery received significant press coverage, and was eventually adapted into four movies.

Perpetrators 

 Joseph McGinnisaccording to O'Keefe's testimony, McGinnis was the mastermind behind the robbery; however, this was later disputed by Geagan. He was responsible for destroying incriminating evidence, including guns, the truck, and clothes. McGinnis died in prison on October 5, 1966.
 Joseph "Specs" O'KeefeO'Keefe died in March 1976, at the age of 67.
 Anthony Pinoaccording to Geagan, Pino was the leader of the gang. Pino died in October 1973, at the age of 67.
 Adolph "Jazz" MaffieMaffie died in September 1988, at the age of 77. He was the last surviving member of the robbery.
 Thomas "Sandy" RichardsonRichardson died in 1980, at the age of 73.
 Vincent CostaCosta was released from prison in 1969 after being paroled. He was arrested again in 1985 and charged with cocaine trafficking.
 Michael GeaganGeagan was released in 1969 after being paroled.
 Henry BakerBaker died in prison in 1961, at the age of 54.
 James FahertyFaherty, along with Geagan and Maffie, was released in 1969 after being paroled.
 Joseph BanfieldBanfield died in 1955, at the age of 45.
 Stanley GuscioraGusciora died in July 1956 of a brain tumor, before he could be tried for his role in the robbery.

Planning 
The robbery was first conceived in 1947; however, in 1948, after months of planning, the group learned that Brink's had moved to a new location. While the theft was originally intended to be a burglary, rather than an armed robbery, they could not find a way around the building's burglar alarm. After observing the movements of the guards, they decided that the robbery should take place just after 7 pm, as the vault would be open and fewer guards would be on duty. Over a period of several months, the robbers removed each lock from the building and had a key made for it, before returning the lock. Two vehicles were stolen: a truck, to carry away the loot from the robbery; and a car, which would be used to block any pursuit. Vincent Costa was the group's lookout, and signalled with a flashlight from a nearby rooftop when he saw the vault being opened. After five aborted runs, Costa finally gave the go-ahead on the night of January 17, 1950.

Robbery 
Seven of the group went into the Brink's building: O’Keefe, Gusciora, Baker, Maffie, Geagan, Faherty, and Richardson. They each wore a chauffeur cap, pea coat, rubber Halloween mask, and each had a .38 caliber revolver. At 7:10 pm, they entered the building and tied up the five employees working in the vault area. They spent about twenty minutes inside the vault, putting money into large canvas bags. Approximately a million dollars in silver and coins was left behind by the robbers, as they were not prepared to carry it. The total amount stolen was $1,218,211 in cash and $1,557,183 in checks and other securities. By 7:37, one of the Brink's employees managed to free themselves and raise the alarm.

Investigation and falling out 

Immediately following the robbery, Police Commissioner Thomas F. Sullivan sent a mobilization order for all precinct captains and detectives. Thirteen people were detained in the hours following the robbery, including two former employees of Brink's. Brink's, Inc. offered a $100,000 reward for information leading to the arrest and conviction of those involved in the robbery, with an additional 5% of recovered cash offered by the insurance company. Director of the Federal Bureau of Investigation, J. Edgar Hoover, took over supervision of the investigation.

The only physical evidence left at the crime scene was a cap and the tape and rope used to bind up the employees. Most of the cash stolen was in denominations of $1 to $20, which made it nearly impossible to trace the bills through serial numbers. Any information police could get from their informers initially proved useless. The truck that the robbers had used was found cut to pieces in Stoughton, Massachusetts, near O'Keefe's home.

In June 1950, O’Keefe and Gusciora were arrested in Pennsylvania for a burglary. O’Keefe was sentenced to three years in Bradford County Jail and Gusciora to 5-to-20 years in the Western State Penitentiary at Pittsburgh. Police heard through their informers that O'Keefe and Gusciora demanded money from Pino and MacGinnis in Boston to fight their convictions. It was later claimed that most of O'Keefe's share went to his legal defense.

FBI agents tried to talk to O'Keefe and Gusciora in prison but the two professed ignorance of the Brink's robbery. Other members of the group came under suspicion but there was not enough evidence for an indictment, so law enforcement kept pressure on the suspects. Adolph Maffie was convicted and sentenced to nine months for income tax evasion.

After O'Keefe was released he was taken to stand trial for another burglary and parole violations and was released on a bail of $17,000. O'Keefe later claimed that he had never seen his portion of the loot after he had given it to Maffie for safekeeping. Apparently in need of money he kidnapped Vincent Costa and demanded his part of the loot for ransom.

Pino paid a small ransom but then decided to try to kill O'Keefe. After a couple of attempts he hired underworld hitman Elmer "Trigger" Burke to kill O'Keefe. Burke traveled to Boston and shot O'Keefe, seriously wounding him but failed to kill him. The FBI approached O'Keefe in the hospital and on January 6, 1956, he decided to talk.

On January 12, 1956, just five days before the statute of limitations was to run out, the FBI arrested Baker, Costa, Geagan, Maffie, McGinnis, and Pino. They apprehended Faherty and Richardson on May 16 in Dorchester. O'Keefe pleaded guilty January 18. Gusciora died on July 9. Banfield was already dead. A trial began on August 6, 1956.

Eight of the gang's members received maximum sentences of life imprisonment. All were paroled by 1971 except McGinnis, who died in prison. O'Keefe received four years and was released in 1960. Only $58,000 of the $2.7 million was recovered. O'Keefe cooperated with writer Bob Considine on The Men Who Robbed Brink's, a 1961 "as told to" book about the robbery and its aftermath.

Films 

At least four movies were based, or partially based, on the Great Brink's Robbery:
Six Bridges to Cross (1955, Joseph Pevney)
Blueprint for Robbery (1961, Jerry Hopper)
 Brinks: The Great Robbery (1976, Marvin J. Chomsky)
 The Brink's Job (1978, William Friedkin)

See also 

 List of bank robbers and robberies
 Large-value US robberies
 1981 Brink's robbery, an armed robbery in the state of New York
 Isabella Stewart Gardner Museum theft, a robbery of artwork in Boston in 1990

References

Further reading

External links 
 Article on the Great Brink's Robbery
 Brink's Robbery- FBI famous cases
 Historical Photos: Boston's Great Brinks Robbery
 The Great Brink's Robbery, and the 70-year-old question: What happened to the money?

1950 crimes in the United States
Bank robberies
1950s in Boston
Robberies in the United States
Crimes in Massachusetts
1950 in Massachusetts
Criminals from Massachusetts
January 1950 events in the United States
North End, Boston